IOS Press is a publishing house headquartered in Amsterdam, specialising in the publication of journals and books related to fields of scientific, technical, and medical research. Established in 1987, IOS Press publishes around 100 international journals and releases about 75 book titles annually, covering fields such as computer science, mathematics, the natural sciences, and topics within medicine.

A subsidiary based in the United States (IOS Press, Inc.) was created in 1990, based in the Washington, D.C. area. In 2005, IOS Press expanded to acquire the publications list of Delft University Press. Several co-publishing and joint venture relationships have been formed, to extend IOS Press' academic publishing coverage in Germany, Japan, and China.

IOS Press is a member of the International Association of Scientific, Technical, and Medical Publishers.

Publications
 Information Services & Use
 Journal of Alzheimer's Disease
 Journal of Neutron Research

References

External links 
 

Publishing companies of the Netherlands
Book publishing companies of the Netherlands
Academic publishing companies
Publishing companies established in 1987
Multinational companies headquartered in the Netherlands
Companies based in Amsterdam